The Kingdom of Romania was a constitutional monarchy that existed in Romania from 13 March (O.S.) / 25 March 1881 with the crowning of prince Karl of Hohenzollern-Sigmaringen as King Carol I (thus beginning the Romanian royal family), until 1947 with the abdication of King Michael I of Romania and the Romanian parliament's proclamation of the Romanian People's Republic.

From 1859 to 1877, Romania evolved from a personal union of two vassal principalities (Moldavia and Wallachia) under a single prince to an autonomous principality with a Hohenzollern monarchy. The country gained its independence from the Ottoman Empire during the 1877–1878 Russo-Turkish War (known locally as the Romanian War of Independence), when it also received Northern Dobruja in exchange for the southern part of Bessarabia. The kingdom's territory during the reign of King Carol I, between 13 (O.S.) / 25 March 1881 and 27 September (O.S.) / 10 October 1914 is sometimes referred as the Romanian Old Kingdom, to distinguish it from "Greater Romania", which included the provinces that became part of the state after World War I (Bessarabia, Banat, Bukovina, and Transylvania).

With the exception of the southern halves of Bukovina and Transylvania, these territories were ceded to neighboring countries in 1940, under the pressure of Nazi Germany or the Soviet Union. Following the abolishment of the 1923 constitution by King Carol II in 1938, the Kingdom of Romania became an absolute monarchy, only to become a military dictatorship under Ion Antonescu in 1940 after the forced abdication of King Carol II, with his successor, King Michael I being a figurehead with no effective political power. The country's name was changed to Legionary Romania.

The disastrous World War II campaign on the side of the Axis powers led to King Michael's Coup against Ion Antonescu in 1944, as a result of which the Kingdom of Romania became a constitutional monarchy again and switched sides to the Allies, recovering Northern Transylvania. The influence of the neighbouring Soviet Union and the policies followed by Communist-dominated coalition governments ultimately led to the abolition of the monarchy, with Romania becoming a Soviet satellite state as the People's Republic of Romania on the last day of 1947.

Unification and monarchy

The 1859 ascendancy of Alexandru Ioan Cuza as prince of both Moldavia and Wallachia under the nominal suzerainty of the Ottoman Empire united an identifiably Romanian nation under a single ruler. On 24 January (O.S.) / 5 February 1862, the two principalities were formally united to form the Principality of Romania, with Bucharest as its capital.

On 11 (O.S.) / 23 February 1866 a so-called Monstrous coalition, composed of Conservatives and radical Liberals, forced Cuza to abdicate. The German prince Charles of Hohenzollern-Sigmaringen was appointed as Prince of Romania, in a move to assure German backing to unity and future independence. He immediately adopted the Romanian spelling of his name, Carol, and his cognatic descendants would rule Romania until the overthrow of the monarchy in 1947.

Following the Russo-Turkish War of 1877–1878, Romania was recognized as an independent state by the Treaty of Berlin, 1878 and acquired Dobruja, although it was forced to surrender southern Bessarabia (Budjak) to Russia. On 15 March 1881, as an assertion of full sovereignty, the Romanian parliament raised the country to the status of a kingdom, and Carol was crowned as king on 10 May.

The new state, squeezed between the Ottoman, Austro-Hungarian, and Russian Empires, with Slavic populations on its southwestern, southern, and northeastern borders, the Black Sea due east, and Hungarian neighbours on its western and northwestern borders, looked to the West, particularly France, for its cultural, educational, and administrative models.

Abstaining from the Initial Balkan War against the Ottoman Empire, the Kingdom of Romania entered the Second Balkan War in June 1913 against the Tsardom of Bulgaria. 330,000 Romanian troops moved across the Danube and into Bulgaria. One army occupied Southern Dobrudja and another moved into northern Bulgaria to threaten Sofia, helping to bring an end to the war. Romania thus acquired the ethnically mixed territory of Southern Dobrudja, which it had desired for years.

In 1916 Romania entered World War I on the Entente side. Romania engaged in a conflict against Bulgaria but as a result Bulgarian forces, after a series of successful battles, regained Dobruja, which had been previously ceded from Bulgaria by the treaty of Bucharest and the Berlin congress. Although the Romanian forces did not fare well militarily, by the end of the war the Austrian and Russian empires were gone; various assemblies proclaimed as representative bodies in Transylvania, Bessarabia and Bukovina decided on union with Romania. In 1919 by the Treaty of Saint-Germain and in 1920 by the Treaty of Trianon most of territories claimed were assigned to Romania.

Old Kingdom (1881–1918)

The Romanian Old Kingdom ( or just Regat;  or ) is a colloquial term referring to the territory covered by the first independent Romanian nation state, which was composed of the Danubian Principalities – Wallachia and Moldavia. It was achieved when, under the auspices of the Treaty of Paris (1856), the ad hoc Divans of both countries – which were under Imperial Ottoman suzerainty at the time – voted for Alexander Ioan Cuza as their prince, thus achieving a de facto unification. The region itself is defined by the result of that political act, followed by the inclusion of Northern Dobruja in 1878, the proclamation of the Kingdom of Romania in 1881, and the annexation of Southern Dobruja in 1913.

The term came into use after World War I, when the Old Kingdom was opposed to Greater Romania, which included Transylvania, Banat, Bessarabia, and Bukovina. Nowadays, the term is mainly of historical relevance, and is otherwise used as a common term for all regions in Romania included in both the Old Kingdom and present-day borders (namely: Wallachia, Moldavia, and Northern Dobruja).

Maps

World War I

Romania delayed in entering World War I, but ultimately declared war on the Central Powers in 1916. The Romanian military campaign ended in stalemate when the Central Powers quickly crushed the country's offensive into Transylvania and occupied Wallachia and Dobruja, including Bucharest and the strategically important oil fields, by the end of 1916. In 1917, despite fierce Romanian resistance, especially at the Battle of Mărășești, due to Russia's withdrawal from the war following the October Revolution, Romania, being almost completely surrounded by the Central Powers, was forced to also drop from the war, signing the Armistice of Focșani and next year, in May 1918, the Treaty of Bucharest. But after the successful offensive on the Thessaloniki front which put Bulgaria out of the war, Romania's government quickly reasserted control and put an army back into the field on 10 November 1918, a day before the war ended in Western Europe. Following the proclamation of the union of Transylvania with the Kingdom of Romania on 1 December 1918 by the representatives of Transylvanian Romanians gathered at Alba Iulia, Transylvania was soon united with the Kingdom, as was Bessarabia earlier in 1918, since the power vacuum in Russia caused by the civil war there allowed the Sfatul Țării, or National Council, to proclaim the union of Bessarabia with Romania. War with the Hungarian Soviet Republic in 1919 resulted in the occupation of Budapest by Romanian troops and the end of Béla Kun's Bolshevik regime.

Greater Romania

Union with Bessarabia, Bukovina and Transylvania

At the Paris Peace Conference, Romania received the territories of Transylvania, part of Banat and other territories from Hungary, as well as Bessarabia (Eastern Moldavia between Prut and Dniester rivers) and Bukovina. In the Treaty of Trianon, Hungary renounced in favor of Romania all the claims of the Austro-Hungarian Monarchy over Transylvania. The union of Romania with Bukovina was ratified in 1919 in the Treaty of Saint Germain, and in 1920 some of the Western powers recognized Romanian rule over Bessarabia by the Treaty of Paris. Thus, Romania in 1920 was more than twice the size it had been in 1914. The last territorial change during this period came in 1923, when a few border settlements were exchanged between Romania and Kingdom of Serbs, Croats and Slovenes. The most notable Romanian acquisition was the town of Jimbolia, while the most notable Yugoslav acquisition was the town of Jaša Tomić.

Romania made no further territorial claims; nonetheless the kingdom's expansion aroused enmity from several of its neighbors, including Bulgaria, the Soviet Union, and especially Hungary. Greater Romania now encompassed a significant minority population, especially of Hungarians, and faced the difficulty of assimilation. Transylvania had significant Hungarian and German population who were accustomed to being the power structure; with a historically contemptuous attitude towards Romanians, they now feared reprisals. Both groups were effectively excluded from politics as the postwar regime passed an edict stating that all personnel employed by the state had to speak Romanian. The new state was also a highly centralized one, so it was unlikely that the Hungarian or German minorities would exercise political influence without personal connections in the government in Bucharest. Despite these policies, the Romanian government permitted both Germans and Hungarians the freedom to have separate schools, publications and judicial hearings in their respective languages. These rights were not extended to other minorities, Jews in particular.

Education
While the Romanian nobility had a long tradition of sending their sons to Europe's finest schools, the educated were otherwise a tiny minority. Transylvania had the most educated population in Greater Romania, while Bessarabia fared the worst. While legally all Romanians were required to undergo at least four years of schooling, in practice few actually did and the system was designed to separate those who would go on to higher education from those who would not. While this was partially necessary due to limited resources, it ensured that peasants had almost no chance of becoming educated.

High school and college education in Romania was modeled after the French system. Students undertook a rigid curriculum based around the liberal arts. Romania suffered from the same problem as the rest of Eastern Europe, which was that most students, coming from aristocratic backgrounds, preferred to study subjects such as theology, philosophy, literature and the fine arts over science, business, and engineering.

Economy

Pre-Kingdom Era to World War I
At the time of the proclamation of the Kingdom, there were already several industrial facilities in the country: The Assan and Olamazu steam mills, built in 1853 and 1862 respectively, a brick factory built in 1865, and two sugar factories built in 1873, among others. In 1857, the first oil refinery in the world was built at Ploiești. In 1880, after several railways were built, the CFR was founded. After proclamation of the Kingdom, the pre-established industrial facilities began to be highly developed: 6 more, larger, sugar factories were built and the railway network was expanded more. Another, more modern brick factory was built in 1891.

Agriculture
Despite all of these industrial achievements, the overwhelming majority of Romania's economy remained agricultural. In 1919, a staggering 72% of Romanians were engaged in agriculture. The Romanian peasantry was among the poorest in the region, a situation aggravated by one of Europe's highest birth rates. Farming was primitive and machinery and chemical fertilizers almost unheard of. The Regat (prewar Romania) was traditionally a land of large estates worked by peasants who either had little or no land of their own. The situation in Transylvania and Bessarabia was marginally better. After peasant calls for land reform snowballed into an avalanche, King Ferdinand had to oblige, especially once the Russian Revolution had encouraged peasants to take the matter in their own hands. The land reform passed in 1921 accomplished little however. Large landowners still controlled up to 30% of Romania's land, including the forests peasants depended on for fuel. The redistributed plots were invariably too small to feed their owners and most peasants could not overcome their tradition of growing grain over cash crops. Nothing was done to remedy basic problems such as rural overpopulation and technological backwardness. Draft animals were rare, to say nothing of machinery, actual productivity was worse than before. Romanian agriculture struggled in the international market, and with the onset of the Great Depression, collapsed completely.

Post-war expansion and growth
The 1938 Romanian GDP amounted to 387.204 billion lei, with a GDP per capita of 20,487 lei at an estimated population of 18.9 million. The 1938 average exchange rate was of 1 leu for 0.00732 USD. Romania's 1938 GDP thus amounted to $2.834 billion.

Romania's public debt as of 1 April 1938 amounted to 112,267,290,144 lei, of which 78,398,078,964 lei consisted of external debt. Total public debt thus amounted to 29% of Romania's 1938 GDP, while public external debt amounted to just over 20%.

Romania's 1913 GDP at the 1990 exchange rate amounted to $11.7 billion. However, the 1990 USD was 9.27 times weaker than the 1938 USD. Thus, Romania's 1913 GDP at the 1938 exchange rate amounted to $1.262 billion.

Industrial development

Despite the destruction provoked by the First World War, Romanian industry managed significant growth, as a result of new establishments and development of the older ones. The MALAXA industrial engineering and manufacturing company was established in 1921 by Romanian industrialist Nicolae Malaxa and dealt especially with rolling stock maintenance and manufacturing. It developed rapidly, and by 1930 Romania had managed to cease importing locomotives altogether, all required rolling stock being supplied by the local industry. Industrial facilities acquired along with the new provinces, such as the Reșița works, also contributed to the rapid development of Romanian heavy industry. Other important establishments were the Copșa Mică works, producing non-ferrous metals and the Romanian Optical Enterprise. Construction also developed, as great monuments like the Caraiman Cross (1928), Arcul de Triumf (1936), and the Mausoleum of Mărășești (1938) were erected. The oil industry was also greatly expanded, making Romania one of the top oil exporters by the late 1930s, which also attracted German and Italian interest.

In 1938, Romania produced 6.6 million tons of crude oil, 284,000 tons of crude steel, 133,000 tons of pig iron, 510,000 tons of cement, and 289,000 tons of rolled steel.

Armament industry

Romanian military industry during World War I was mainly focused on converting various fortification guns into field and anti-aircraft artillery. Up to 334 German 53 mm Fahrpanzer guns, 93 French 57 mm Hotchkiss guns, 66 Krupp 150 mm guns and dozens more 210 mm guns were mounted on Romanian-built carriages and transformed into mobile field artillery, with 45 Krupp 75 mm guns and 132 Hotchkiss 57 mm guns being transformed into anti-aircraft artillery. The Romanians also upgraded 120 German Krupp 105 mm howitzers, the result being the most effective field howitzer in Europe at that time. Romania even managed to design and build from scratch its own model of mortar, the 250 mm Negrei Model 1916. Other Romanian technological assets include the building of Vlaicu III, the world's first aircraft made of metal. The Romanian Navy possessed the largest warships on the Danube. They were a class of 4 river monitors, built locally at the Galați shipyard using parts manufactured in Austria-Hungary, and the first one launched was Lascăr Catargiu, in 1907. The Romanian monitors displaced almost 700 tons, were armed with three 120 mm naval guns in 3 turrets, two 120 mm naval howitzers, four 47 mm anti-aircraft guns and two 6.5 machine guns. The monitors took part in the Battle of Turtucaia and the First Battle of Cobadin. The Romanian-designed Schneider 150 mm Model 1912 howitzer was considered one of the most modern field guns on the Western Front.

The Romanian armament industry was expanded greatly during the Interwar period and World War II. New factories were constructed, such as the Industria Aeronautică Română and Societatea Pentru Exploatări Tehnice aircraft factories, which produced hundreds of indigenous aircraft, such as IAR 37, IAR 80, and SET 7. Before the war, Romania acquired from France the licence to produce hundreds of Brandt Mle 27/31 and Brandt Mle 1935 mortars, with hundreds more produced during the war, and also the licence to produce 140 French 47 mm Schneider anti-tank guns at the Concordia factory, with 118 produced between 26 May 1939 and 1 August 1940 and hundreds more produced during the war; these guns were to be towed by Malaxa Tip UE armored carriers, built since late 1939 at the Malaxa factory under French licence, eventually 126 being built until March 1941. Czechoslovak licence was acquired in 1938 to produce the ZB vz. 30 machine gun, with 5,000 being built at the Cugir gun factory until the start of Operation Barbarossa in June 1941. Romania also acquired the licence to produce the R-1 tankette, but ultimately only one prototype was built locally. German licence was acquired in 1938 to produce 360 37 mm Rheinmetall anti-aircraft guns, but only 102 were produced until May 1941. British licence was acquired to produce 100 Vickers Model 1931 75 mm anti-aircraft guns at the Reșița works, with the first battery of 6 guns entering service on 1 August 1939, and 100 more guns were built during the war for a total production of 200. On 14 June, Romania launched the first locally-built warship, the minelayer .

During the war, Romania copied and produced hundreds of Soviet M1938 mortars, as well as designing and producing up to 400 75 mm Reșița Model 1943 anti-tank guns. Infantry weapons designed and produced by Romania during the war include the Orița M1941 sub-machinegun and the Argeș flamethrower. Romania also built 30 Vănătorul de care R-35, 34 TACAM T-60, 21 TACAM R-2 tank destroyers and rebuilt 34 captured Soviet Komsomolets armored tractors. A few prototype vehicles were also built, such as the Mareșal tank destroyer, which is credited with being the inspiration for the German Hetzer, a Renault R-35 tank with a T-26 turret and an artillery tractor known as T-1.

The interbellum years
The Romanian expression România Mare (literal translation "Great Romania", but more commonly rendered in English: "Greater Romania") generally refers to the Romanian state in the interwar period, and by extension, to the territory Romania covered at the time. Romania achieved at that time its greatest territorial extent (almost ). At the 1930 census, there were over 18 million inhabitants in Romania.

The resulting "Greater Romania" did not survive World War II. Until 1938, Romania's governments maintained the form, if not always the substance, of a liberal constitutional monarchy. The National Liberal Party, dominant in the years immediately after World War I, became increasingly clientelist and nationalist, and in 1927 was supplanted in power by the National Peasants' Party. Between 1930 and 1940 there were over 25 separate governments; on several occasions in the last few years before World War II, the rivalry between the fascist Iron Guard and other political groupings approached the level of a civil war.

Upon the death of King Ferdinand in 1927, his son, Prince Carol, was prevented from succeeding him because of previous marital scandals that had resulted in his renunciation of rights to the throne. After living three years in exile, with his brother Nicolae serving as regent and his young son Michael as king, Carol changed his mind and with the support of the ruling National Peasants' Party he returned and proclaimed himself king.

Iuliu Maniu, leader of the National Peasants' Party, engineered Carol's return on the basis of a promise that he would forsake his mistress Magda Lupescu, and Lupescu herself had agreed to the arrangement. However, it became clear upon Carol's first re-encounter with his former wife, Elena, that he had no interest in a reconciliation with her, and Carol soon arranged for Magda Lupescu's return to his side. Her unpopularity was a millstone around Carol's neck for the rest of his reign, particularly because she was widely viewed as his closest advisor and confidante. Maniu and his National Peasant Party shared the same general political aims as the Iron Guard: both fought against the corruption and dictatorial policies of King Carol II and the National Liberal Party.

The worldwide Great Depression that started in 1929 and was also present in Romania destabilised the country. The early 1930s were marked by social unrest, high unemployment, and strikes. In several instances, the Romanian government violently repressed strikes and riots, notably the 1929 miners' strike in Valea Jiului and the strike in the Grivița railroad workshops. In the mid-1930s, the Romanian economy recovered and the industry grew significantly, although about 80% of Romanians were still employed in agriculture. French economic and political influence was predominant in the early 1920s but then Germany became more dominant, especially in the 1930s.

As the 1930s progressed, Romania's already shaky democracy slowly deteriorated toward fascist dictatorship. The constitution of 1923 gave the king free rein to dissolve parliament and call elections at will; as a result, Romania experienced over 25 governments in a single decade.

Increasingly, these governments were dominated by a number of anti-Semitic, ultra-nationalist, and mostly at least quasi-fascist parties. The National Liberal Party steadily became more nationalistic than liberal, but nonetheless lost its dominance over Romanian politics. It was eclipsed by parties like the (relatively moderate) National Peasants' Party and its more radical Romanian Front offshoot, the National-Christian Defense League (LANC) and the Iron Guard. In 1935, LANC merged with the National Agrarian Party to form the National Christian Party (NCP). The quasi-mystical fascist Iron Guard was an earlier LANC offshoot that, even more than these other parties, exploited nationalist feelings, fear of communism, and resentment of alleged foreign and Jewish domination of the economy.

Already the Iron Guard had embraced the politics of assassination, and various governments had reacted more or less in kind. On December 10, 1933, Liberal prime minister Ion Duca "dissolved" the Iron Guard, arresting thousands; consequently, 19 days later he was assassinated by Iron Guard legionnaires.

Throughout the 1930s, these nationalist parties had a mutually distrustful relationship with King Carol II. Nonetheless, in December 1937, the king appointed LANC leader, the poet Octavian Goga, as prime minister of Romania's first Fascist government. Around this time, Carol met with Adolf Hitler, who expressed his wish to see a Romanian government headed by the pro-Nazi Iron Guard. Instead, on 10 February 1938 King Carol II used the occasion of a public insult by Goga toward Lupescu as a reason to dismiss the government and institute a short-lived royal dictatorship, sanctioned 17 days later by a new constitution under which the king named personally not only the prime minister but all the ministers.

In April 1938, King Carol had Iron Guard leader Corneliu Zelea Codreanu (aka "The Captain") arrested and imprisoned. On the night of 29–30 November 1938, Codreanu and several other legionnaires were killed while purportedly attempting to escape from prison. It is generally agreed that there was no such escape attempt, but that they were murdered in retaliation for a series of assassinations by Iron Guard commandos.

The royal dictatorship was brief. On 7 March 1939, a new government was formed with Armand Călinescu as prime minister; on 21 September 1939, three weeks after the start of World War II, Călinescu, in turn, was also assassinated by legionnaires avenging Codreanu's murder.

In 1939, Germany and the Soviet Union signed the Molotov–Ribbentrop Pact, which stipulated, among other things, the Soviet "interest" in Bessarabia. After the 1940 territorial losses and growing increasingly unpopular, Carol was compelled to abdicate and name general Ion Antonescu as the new Prime-Minister with full powers in ruling the state by royal decree.

Monarchs

Demographics

According to the 1930 Romanian Census, Romania had a population of 18,057,028. Romanians made up 71.9% of the population and 28.1% of the population were ethnic minorities.

Cities

Largest cities as per 1930 census:

Notes: 1 - including 12 suburban communities.

Two of Romania's seven largest cities in 1930 are currently located outside of Romania as a result of World War II border changes.

Administrative division

After Independence, the Romanian Old Kingdom was divided into 33 counties.

After World War I, as a result of the 1925 administrative unification law, the territory was divided into 71 counties, 489 districts (plăși) and 8,879 communes.

In 1938, King Carol II promulgated a new Constitution, and subsequently he had the administrative division of the Romanian territory changed. Ten ținuturi (approximate translation: "lands") were created (by merging the counties) to be ruled by rezidenți regali (approximate translation: "Royal Residents") - appointed directly by the King. This administrative reform did not last and the counties were re-established after the fall of Carol's regime.

Timeline (1859–1940)

Kings of Romania (1881–1947)

Queens-consort of Romania

Pretenders to the Romanian throne

Timeline
This is a graphical lifespan timeline of Kings

<div style="overflow:auto">

Royal Standards

See also
 Danubian Vilayet (1864–1878), Ottoman administrative division that included Northern Dobruja
 Historical administrative divisions of Romania
 Kingdom of Romania under Fascism
 Monarchism in Romania

Notes

References

Further reading
 Great Britain. Admiralty. A handbook of Roumania (1920) primary source that focuses on prewar economy and society online free
 Treptow, Kurt W. A history of Romania (1996).

External links

 

 
Romania
Romania
Romania
Romania, Kingdom of
20th century in Moldova
States and territories established in 1881
1881 in Romania
States and territories disestablished in 1947
1947 in Romania

Romania
1880s in Romania
1890s in Romania
1900s in Romania
1910s in Romania
1920s in Romania
1930s in Romania
1940s in Romania
Romania
Axis powers
1881 establishments in Romania
1947 disestablishments in Romania